Couma is a genus of flowering plants in the family Apocynaceae first described as a genus in 1775. It is native to South America and Central America.

Species
 Couma catingae Ducke - Colombia, Venezuela, Guyana, NW Brazil
 Couma guianensis Aubl. - Pará, the Guianas
 Couma macrocarpa Barb.Rodr. - widespread from Belize to Bolivia
 Couma rigida Müll.Arg. - Venezuela, Guyana, N Brazil
 Couma utilis (Mart.) Müll.Arg. - Colombia, Venezuela, NW Brazil

References

 
Apocynaceae genera